Ship-of-the-line lieutenant is a naval officer rank, used in a number of countries. The name derives from the name of the largest class of warship, the ship of the line, as opposed to smaller types of warship (corvettes and frigates).

It is rated OF-2 within the NATO ranking system and is equivalent to Lieutenant in the Royal Navy and the United States Navy.

Gallery

See also
Ship-of-the-line captain

References and sources 

Naval ranks